Silvana De Mari (born 5 July 1953) is an Italian writer of children's fiction.
She's known worldwide as the author of L'ultimo Elfo (2004), an award-winning fantasy novel published in English and 18 other languages (UK The Last Elf, US The Last Dragon). The book won the prestigious Italian prizes Premio Bancarellino and Premio Andersen. In France, it won the Prix Imaginales in 2005.

Biography 
De Mari was born in 1953 in Santa Maria Capua Vetere (Caserta, Italy). 
She formerly worked as a surgeon in both Italy and Ethiopia, before setting up a private psychotherapy practice in Turin. 

L'ultimo Elfo (The Last Elf, published in the US as The Last Dragon) was her third children's book and the first to be translated into English. It has also been translated into French, German, Spanish, Portuguese, and several other languages for a total of 23 Countries (Brazil, Bulgaria, China, Finland, France, Germany Hungary, Japan, Latvia, Lithuania, Macedonia, Netherlands, Panama, Poland, Portugal, Romania, Russia, Spain, Thailand, Taiwan, Ukraine, United Kingdom, USA).

The following book [L'Ultimo Orco] (The Last Ogre) won the IBBY International Boud Books Young People 2006 prize and the Prix Sorcières "Les prix en littérature jeunesse" in 2009 in France. It's been published in France, Germany, Hungary, Japan, Lithuania, Macedonia, Panama, Romania Thailand, United Kingdom, USA.

Controversies 
As of early 2017, after a claim made by some homosexual associations, De Mari has been convened before the Italian Medical Association for her statements regarding homosexuality (which she states "does not exist"), homosexual associations (defined as "criminals") and anal intercourse, defined by the President of the Order of Medical Doctors as not matching what Medicine thinks today. As of today, a disciplinary action is on going.

She defined the APA "nonsensical", she referred to gay bowel syndrome, a controversial term, and denied that homosexuality exists, saying, "" (There is only one sexuality and biologically-loser people who refuse it).

With regard to the Diagnostic and Statistical Manual of Mental Disorders she also said:The APA, American Psychiatric Association, rules the world using a statistical diagnostic manual without which you can not make an official diagnosis or expertise. The DSM (Diagnostic Statistical Manual) costs lots of money and has the same ethical and scientific value that had the various posters on race.

In 2013, De Mari wrote an open letter to Pope Francis, urging him to defend persecuted Christians rather than pursue popularity.

Convictions for Defamation of LGBT People 
Silvana De Mari was convicted in two defamation cases before the Italian district court of Turin.

In the first case, charges were based on claims made by an LGBT Turin group along with the Human Rights Committee of Piedmont and the City of Turin, regarding statements of Dr. De Mari, where she pointed out anal sex is recurring in satanism, homosexual associations to crimes and defined homosexuals as "new aryan race", and "idiots". Silvana De Mari was recognized guilty of defamation and sentenced to pay a fine of 1,500 euros in addition to a compensation of 5,000 euros for LGBT associations.

The second case was motivated by a complaint of the Homosexual Association Mario Mieli, whose members were accused by Silvana De Mari of promoting pedophilia, necrophilia and coprophagia. This second case also ended with a conviction for defamation. Silvana De Mari paid a €1,500 fine plus €5,000 as a compensation to the injured association.

Works

Novels 
 
 
 
 
 Giuseppe figlio di Giacobbe, Effatà, 2014
 La nuova dinastia 2015, 2017.
 Il gatto dagli occhi d'oro, Giunti, 2015.
 Sulle ali della libertà 2016.

[[The Series of Last|L'ultimo elfo saga]]:
 
 
 
 
  (Prequel de L'ultimo elfo)
 
 

Hania trilogy
 Hania. Il regno delle tigri bianche, Giunti 2015
 Hania. Il cavaliere di luce, Giunti 2015
 Hania. La strega muta, Giunti 2016

Essays 
 
 
 L'ultimo nemico che sarà sconfitto è la morte. Joanne Kathleen Rowling e l'eptalogia di Harry Potter ne Il Fantastico nella Letteratura per ragazzi. Luci e ombre di 10 serie di successo, a cura di Marina Lenti, Runa Editrice, 2016.
 Le avventure di Bilbo Baggins, scassinatore, esperto cacciatore di tesori: l'oro e la menzogna nello Hobbit in Hobbitologia, a cura di Marina Lenti e Paolo Gulisano, Camelozampa, 2016.

References

External links 

 

1953 births
Living people
Italian children's writers
Italian women children's writers
Italian medical writers
Italian women writers
Italian women physicians
Psychotherapists